Pennsylvania Railroad class E3c comprised a pair of experimental C-C (AAR) or Co-Co (UIC) electric locomotives.  The bodywork and running gear was produced by Baldwin-Lima-Hamilton while the electrical equipment was provided by Westinghouse, who also acted as principal contractor.

In 1952 the Pennsylvania Railroad took delivery of eight experimental locomotives, four from General Electric and four from Westinghouse. While GE's were all of the same class (E2b), the Westinghouse locomotives were split into two classes. Two locomotives had three two-axle trucks (E3b).

The significant technical difference between the locomotives was that those from General Electric used traditional AC traction motors. Those by Westinghouse had mercury arc rectifiers to convert the AC traction power to DC. In consequence they were able to use ordinary DC traction motors, identical to those on contemporary diesel-electric locomotives.

The locomotives were scrapped in 1964. However, the rectifier principle they pioneered soon became the standard for new AC electric locomotives,

References

Citations

Sources 

 
 

11 kV AC locomotives
E3c
C-C locomotives
Baldwin locomotives
Experimental locomotives
Westinghouse locomotives
Electric locomotives of the United States
Scrapped locomotives
Standard gauge locomotives of the United States
Railway locomotives introduced in 1952

Streamlined electric locomotives